Sophie Cook (born 12 September 1994) is an English international athlete. She has represented England at the Commonwealth Games.

Biography
Cook won the British indoor high jump title at the 2020 British Indoor Athletics Championships and has won three silver medals at the British Athletics Championships in 2018, 2019 and 2020 and a bronze medal at the 2021 British Athletics Championships. She recorded a personal best of 4.45 metres at the 2022 Diamond League in Birmingham.

In 2022, she was selected for the women's pole vault event at the 2022 Commonwealth Games in Birmingham.

References

1994 births
Living people
English female pole vaulters
British female pole vaulters
Commonwealth Games competitors for England
Athletes (track and field) at the 2022 Commonwealth Games